The Junk Beer Kidnap Band is an American rock band from Des Moines, Iowa, formed in 2009. They are a side project of Corey Taylor, frontman of Slipknot and Stone Sour. Since their formation, JBKB have currently solely been a touring band for lead singer and guitarist Taylor's solo work. No official studio album has been announced.

History 
Originally conceptualized as "the first stoner rock disco funk band" by vocalist and guitarist Corey Taylor, JBKB were formed in 2008. To begin with they wrote nine songs together, however it was when the band were jamming Taylor's solo material that he asked them to "back him up" on his shows he was planning. Taylor describes it as "pure Midwest rock" with "big chords, huge choruses and a lot of melody". To date, the band has played some original songs as well as covers of songs from Stone Sour and others.

The JBKB original song "Imperfect" was slowed down and put in Stone Sour's 2010 release Audio Secrecy. The original version also had drums and an alternate ending, both of which were taken out of the Stone Sour version.

Band members 

 Corey Taylor – vocals, guitar
 Nik Sorak – guitar
 Jason Christopher – bass
 Tyson Leslie – keyboard
 Thomas Doggett – saxophone
 Ryan Berrier – drums

References 

Alternative rock groups from Iowa
Musical groups from Des Moines, Iowa
Musical groups established in 2009